Hasbergen is a municipality in the district of Osnabrück, in Lower Saxony, Germany. It is situated in the Teutoburg Forest, approx. 7 km west of Osnabrück. Hasbergen consists of Hasbergen proper, Gaste and Ohrbeck.

The municipality lies partly in the Hüggel hills, that belongs to the Teutoburg Forest Protected Area. The hills range from 62 to 228 metres above sea level (NN). In Hasbergen is the 108-metre-high Rote Berg.

References

Osnabrück (district)